Ahn Sun-ju, or Sun-ju Ahn (born 31 August 1987) is a South Korean professional golfer currently playing on the LPGA of Japan Tour. She led the LPGA of Japan Tour money list in 2010, 2011, 2014, and 2018.

Professional wins (35)

LPGA Tour wins (1)

^ Co-sanctioned with the LPGA of Japan Tour

LPGA Tour playoff record (1–0)

LPGA of Korea Tour wins (7)

LPGA of Japan Tour wins (28)

^ Co-sanctioned with the LPGA Tour

External links

Biography on seoulsisters.com

South Korean female golfers
LPGA of Japan Tour golfers
LPGA of Korea Tour golfers
1987 births
Living people